Jackson Township is one of fifteen townships in Effingham County, Illinois, USA.  As of the 2010 census, its population was 1,215 and it contained 486 housing units.

Geography

Cities, towns, villages
 Watson (west edge)

Extinct towns
 Dexter
 Freenanton
 Keptown

Cemeteries
The township contains these eight cemeteries: Fremington, Funkhouser, Little Prairie, Miller Chapel, New Salem, Old Salem, Porter and Turner.

Major highways
  Interstate 57
  Interstate 70
  U.S. Route 40

Demographics

School districts
 Altamont Community Unit School District 10
 Effingham Community Unit School District 40

Political districts
 Illinois' 19th congressional district
 State House District 102
 State Senate District 51

References
 
 United States Census Bureau 2007 TIGER/Line Shapefiles
 United States National Atlas

External links
 City-Data.com
 Illinois State Archives

Townships in Effingham County, Illinois
1860 establishments in Illinois
Populated places established in 1860
Townships in Illinois